Elections for the Diet of Bosnia and Herzegovina were held from 18 May to 28 May 1910. This was the only Bosnian-Herzegovinian election held during Austro-Hungarian rule. 72 Members of parliament (MPs) were elected. There were three major political parties, though two other smaller political parties were elected also. The first vote consisted of landowners, college-educated citizens, priests, active and retired civil servants, and others. The second vote consisted of the population belonging to that of the city, which were artisans, merchants, petty bourgeoisie, etc.. The third and final vote consisted of the rural population. The first vote elected 18 seats of parliament, voted in by 6,866 voters. The second vote elected 20 seats of parliament, voted in by 4,725 voters. And the third vote elected 34 seats of parliament, voted in by 347,573 voters. The number of MPs were determined by religious percentage. Thus, the most populous religion at the time in the area, Eastern Orthodox Christianity, had 31 MPs elected. The next largest was Islam, where 24 MPs had been elected. The other religions elected were Catholicism (16 MPs), and Judaism (1 MP).

Results
During the Bosnian-Herzegovinian parliamentary election of 1910, Most seats in the elections were from the Serbian National Organization (31), who won all seats Orthodox population, followed by the Muslim National Organization (24), followed by the Croat People's Union (12) and the Croatian Catholic Association (4), which were both Catholic. The other 1 MP elected was Jewish.

References

Elections in Bosnia and Herzegovina
Bosnia
Parliamentary
May 1910 events
Election and referendum articles with incomplete results